The Honourable Judge John Lawrence O'Meally (AM RFD) (born 1939) was president of the Dust Diseases Tribunal of New South Wales. He was the first judge to hear a dust diseases case in the tribunal after it was created in 1989. He was also Australia's longest serving judge, having spent 32 years on the bench, when he retired on 17 November 2011.

Education

Marcellin College Randwick and the University of Sydney.

Appointments
   
Admitted to the NSW Bar and Australian Bars 1964
Judge of the Compensation Court of New South Wales 1984 - 2003
Judge of the District Court of New South Wales 2003 to present
President of the Dust Diseases Tribunal of New South Wales since 1998
Senior Member of the Dust Diseases Tribunal of New South Wales 1995–1998
Member of the Dust Diseases Tribunal of New South Wales 1989–1995
Judge Eastern Caribbean Supreme Court 2001
Judge of the High Court Antigua and Barbuda 2001
Judge of the Workers Compensation Commission of New South Wales 1979–1984
Acting Judge of the National Court of Justice, Papua New Guinea 1977

See also
 Judiciary of Australia

References
Who's Who Australia.
Annual Review, Dust Diseases Tribunal of NSW, 2004.

20th-century Australian judges
Living people
Australian judges on the courts of Antigua and Barbuda
Australian judges on the courts of Papua New Guinea
1939 births
Members of the Order of Australia
21st-century Australian judges
Judges of the District Court of NSW